The fifth and final series of the British fantasy drama series Merlin began broadcasting on 6 October 2012 with the episode "Arthur's Bane – Part 1" and ended on 24 December 2012 in the UK, with "The Diamond of the Day – Part 2". It consists of 13 episodes shown on Saturday evenings on BBC One and BBC One HD (repeats shown on BBC Three). Series producer is Sara Hamill and executive producers are Johnny Capps and Julian Murphy. Directors include Justin Molotnikov, Ashley Way, Alice Troughton and Declan O'Dwyer. Writers include Julian Jones (head writer), Howard Overman, Jake Michie and Richard McBrien.

Series five stars the regular cast from the previous series including Colin Morgan, Angel Coulby, Bradley James, Katie McGrath, and Richard Wilson. Anthony Head returns to the cast in a one episode guest appearance. Alexander Vlahos became part of the regular cast in this series and John Hurt returned as the voice of the Dragon. Supporting cast members include Adetomiwa Edun, Eoin Macken, Tom Hopper, and Rupert Young. It was announced on 26 November 2012 that Merlin would end with the fifth series. The two-part finale was broadcast on 22 and 24 December 2012.

Plot 
After three years of peace and harmony, Camelot's future could not appear brighter. But as Merlin helps King Arthur to bring the kingdom into a Golden Age, the seeds of Camelot's destruction are being sown as the sorceress Morgana Pendragon resumes plotting Arthur's downfall.

When an old face returns to the castle and gains a position amongst the king's inner circle, Merlin must be on guard more than ever. For the new arrival is the sorcerer Mordred, the Druid boy whose destiny it is to end the King's life and bring chaos to Camelot; after all, Merlin has been warned in the past that Mordred is destined to unite with the evil Morgana in a deadly alliance which will destroy Camelot. With the death song of King Uther haunting the castle, Morgana's powers greater and more dangerous than ever and Guinevere crossing over to the dark side, both Merlin and Arthur find that their destinies are approaching. The battle for Camelot is headed for a deadly conclusion and nothing will ever be the same again.

Cast

Main cast 
 Colin Morgan as Merlin
 Angel Coulby as Guinevere
 Bradley James as Arthur Pendragon
 Katie McGrath as Morgana Pendragon
 Richard Wilson as Gaius

Recurring 
 John Hurt as the Great Dragon (voice)
 Rupert Young as Sir Leon
 Eoin Macken as Sir Gwaine
 Adetomiwa Edun as Sir Elyan
 Tom Hopper as Sir Percival
 Alexander Vlahos as Mordred

Guest star 
 Stephen McCole as Ragnor
 Matthew Prowse as Saxon
 Liam Cunningham as Ruadan
 James Fox as King Rodor
 Alfie Stewart as Daegal
 John Bradley West as Tyr Seward
 Julian Glover as Lochru
 Anthony Head as Uther Pendragon
 Erin Richards as Eira
 Tony Guilfoyle as Sindri
 Peter Guinness as Ari
 Kelly Wenham as Queen Mab
 Jane Thorne as Valdis
 Sophie Rundle as Sefa
 Josette Simon as The Euchdag
 Barry Aird as Beroun
 Frances Tomelty as Disir
 Alexandra Dowling as Kara
 Gordon Munro as Alrick
 John Shrapnel as King Sarrum

Episodes

References

2012 American television seasons
Merlin (2008 TV series)